Acinetobacter guangdongensis is a gram-negative and non-motile bacterium from the genus Acinetobacter which has been isolated from a lead-zinc ore mine in Mei County in Meizhou in China.

References

External links
Type strain of Acinetobacter guangdongensis at BacDive - the Bacterial Diversity Metadatabase	

Moraxellaceae
Bacteria described in 2014